is a Japanese manga writer and illustrator.

Inuki was born in Hokkaidō and moved to Tokyo as a young girl.  Starting out with an interest in manga she began to draw and write for horror manga. Her first published work was the short story Orusuban in 1987, which was published in a special edition of the shōjo manga magazine Shōjo Friend which was compiled by Kazuo Umezu. She was then a part of the 1990s boom in the horror genre in the Japanese manga market, becoming one of the leading authors and publishing in magazines like Mystery House, Suspiria and Suspense & Horror. Her work is characterized by a rich style of terror, influenced by folklore, tradition and the moralising ironic humor. She has been called the "Queen of the Horror Manga".

Works
Orusuban (おるすばん), 1987, published in Shōjo Friend
Hell Mother (ヘル・マザー), 1990
Kanaerareta Negai (かなえられた願い), 1991
Fushigi no Tatari-chan (不思議のたたりちゃん), 1991-1998, published in Shōjo Friend and Suspense & Horror
Presents (プレゼント, Puresento), 1993-1998, published in Suspiria
Kuchisake Onna Densetsu (口裂け女伝説), 1995
Bukita-kun (不気田くん), 1995, published in Horror M
School Zone (スクールゾーン), 1996-1997, published in Kyōfu no Yakata DX
Kaidan (怪談), 1996
Warau Nikumen (笑う肉面), 1996
Inuki Kanako no Daikyōfu! (犬木加奈子の大恐怖!), 1997
Horror Anthology Comic Shikaku
13-nin no Short Suspense & Horror
Doko ni demo Aru Chotto Kowai Hanashi
Kaiki Ningyoukan

References and sources

1958 births
Living people
People from Hokkaido